Notre Dame High School (NDHS) in Sherman Oaks, Los Angeles, California, is a co-ed Catholic college preparatory high school founded by the Congregation of Holy Cross in 1947.

Located in the Catholic Archdiocese of Los Angeles, Notre Dame was designated a United States Department of Education Blue Ribbon school for 1990–1991 and 1994–1996 .

Demographics
The demographic breakdown of the 1,229 students enrolled for 2017–18 was:
 Native American/Alaskan = 0.6%
 Asian = 6.2%
 Black = 8.0%
 Hispanic = 17.3%
 Native Hawaiian/Pacific islander = 5.8%
 White = 62.2%

Notable alumni

 Lily Aldridge - model
 Ed Begley Jr. – actor
 Rachel Bilson – actress
 John S. Boskovich – artist, writer, filmmaker, and teacher
 Joseph Vincent Brennan – Roman Catholic Bishop of Fresno
 Nick Cassavetes – actor and director
 Dayne Crist – football player
 Patrick Curtis – motion picture/TV writer producer
 Chris Dickerson – Major League Baseball player
 Jamie Dixon – men's basketball coach at TCU.
 Maggie Dixon – women's basketball coach at U.S. Military Academy
 Terry Donahue – football player and coach
 Kelly Dugan – MiLB baseball player
 Kirsten Dunst – actress
 Justin Fargas – NFL running back 
 Maureen Flannigan – actress
 Tim Foli – MLB player
 Nick Folk – NFL kicker
 Kai Forbath – NFL kicker
 Taylor Fry – actress
 Amanda Fuller – actress
 Tom Gamboa—baseball coach and manager
 Donald Gibb – actor
 Pat Gillick – baseball executive
 Greg Goossen – MLB player
 Ben Gottschalk – NFL football offensive lineman
 Hunter Greene – MLB pitcher
 Devon Gummersall – actor
 Cary Harris – football player
 Brett Hayes – MLB player
 Wes Horton – NFL defensive end
 Spencer Johnson – author
 Travis Johnson – NFL football defensive end
 Staci Keanan – actor
 Richard Keith – actor
 Emilee Klein – LPGA golfer
 David Kopay – football running back
 David C. Lane – professor of philosophy and sociology/author
 Harper LeBel – football player
 Rami Malek – actor
 Arash Markazi – journalist
 Rich Marotta – sports reporter
 Jerry Mathers – actor
 Jack McDowell – MLB pitcher, Cy Young Award Winner
 Stephen McEveety – film producer
 Katharine McPhee – singer
 Nigel Miguel – basketball player, film actor and producer
 Michael Minkler – motion picture soundman
 Bob Moretti – Speaker of California State Assembly
 Khalfani Muhammad - NFL running back
 Michael Mullen – admiral in U.S. Navy and Chairman of the Joint Chiefs of Staff
 Liliana Mumy – actress
 Daniel Munyer – NFL offensive lineman
 Dave Navarro – guitarist
 Kathryn Newton – actress
 Devon Odessa – actress
 Josh Oppenheimer – basketball player and coach
 Stephen Perkins – drummer
 Jorge Piedra – MLB player
 Brendan Ryan – MLB infielder
 Chris Sailer – pro football player
 C. J. Sanders – football player
 Bill Seward – radio-TV sportscaster
 Lindsey Shaw – actress
 Giancarlo Stanton – MLB outfielder 2017 NL MVP 
 Tad Stones – animator, screenwriter, producer and director
 Mary Strong – sportscaster
 Jimmy Tatro – filmmaker
 Michelle Trachtenberg – actress
 John Vella – NFL offensive lineman.
 Jim Yester — singer and musician
 Dennis Zine – Los Angeles City Councilman

References

External links 
 

1947 establishments in California
Catholic secondary schools in California
Educational institutions established in 1947
High schools in the San Fernando Valley
Holy Cross secondary schools
Roman Catholic secondary schools in Los Angeles County, California
Sherman Oaks, Los Angeles